Isaac Asare (born 1 September 1974 in Kumasi) is a football player from Ghana, who was a member of the Men's National Team that won the bronze medal at the 1992 Summer Olympics in Barcelona, Spain. In 2006, Asare obtained Belgian nationality.

Asare played 44 times for his country, in which he scored 12 times. He played for Ghana at the 1989 FIFA U-16 World Championship, 1991 FIFA U-17 World Championship and 1993 FIFA World Youth Championship.

Football career
  Cornerstones Kumasi
  Anderlecht
  Cercle Brugge
  Naoussa
  Dessel Sport
  Lentezon Beerse

Trivia
 In 1998, Isaac Asare won the Cercle Brugge Pop Poll, which is equal to a Player of the Year award.

References

External links
 
 Cerclemuseum.be 
 
 
 

1974 births
Living people
Cercle Brugge K.S.V. players
Ghanaian footballers
Ghana under-20 international footballers
Ghana international footballers
Ghanaian emigrants to Belgium
Footballers at the 1992 Summer Olympics
Olympic footballers of Ghana
Olympic bronze medalists for Ghana
R.S.C. Anderlecht players
Belgian Pro League players
Challenger Pro League players
Expatriate footballers in Belgium
Expatriate footballers in Greece
1992 African Cup of Nations players
1996 African Cup of Nations players
K.F.C. Dessel Sport players
Olympic medalists in football
Footballers from Kumasi
Medalists at the 1992 Summer Olympics
Association football fullbacks
Cornerstones F.C. players